Cornelis Kruys (1619, in Haarlem – 1660, in Schiedam) was a Dutch Golden Age painter.

According to the RKD, he was a painter of flower still lifes. He became a member of the Haarlem Guild of St. Luke in 1644. He became a member of the Leiden Guild of St. Luke in 1649, and moved to Schiedam in 1651.

References

External links
Cornelis Kruys on Artnet

1619 births
1660 deaths
Dutch Golden Age painters
Dutch male painters
Artists from Haarlem
Painters from Haarlem
Painters from Leiden